Jean Maitron (17 December 1910 – 16 November 1987) was a French historian specialist of the labour movement. A pioneer of such historical studies in France, he introduced it to University and gave it its archives base, by creating in 1949 the Centre d'histoire du syndicalisme (Historic Center of Trade-Unions) in the Sorbonne, which received important archives from activists such as Paul Delesalle, Émile Armand, Pierre Monatte, and others. He was the Center's secretary until 1969.

Maitron, however, is best known for his Dictionnaire biographique du mouvement ouvrier français (DBMOF or, more currently, Le Maitron), a comprehensive biographical dictionary of figures from the French workers' movement which was continued after his death, as well as a study of anarchism, History of anarchism in France (first ed. 1951), which has become a classic. Starting with the 1789 French Revolution, it includes 103,000 entries gathered by 455 different authors working under Maitron's direction. The Maitron has now extended itself with international versions, treating Austria (1971), United Kingdom (1979 and 1986), Japan (1979), Germany (1990), China (1985), Morocco (1998), United States from 1848 to 1922 (2002), a transnational one about the Komintern (2001) and the most recently published about Algeria (2006), almost all published at the Éditions de l'Atelier.

Jean Maitron also founded and directed two reviews, L'Actualité de l'Histoire and then Le Mouvement social, which were directed after his death by Madeleine Rebérioux (1920–2005) then Patrick Fridenson (currently director of studies at the EHESS).

Biography
Born in a family of teachers with Communist ideas, Jean Maitron joined the French Communist Party (PCF) in 1931 only to leave it the next year, opposed to its "social fascist" line. He then became a member of the Trotskyist Ligue communiste which was supporting an anti-fascist line, but he left it when Leon Trotsky advocated fusion with the French Section of the Workers' International (SFIO) (dubbed "French Turn", which took place between 1934 and 1936). Maitron wrote to Marcel Cachin and was allowed to return to the PCF, where he remained a member until the World War II. During the 1930s, Jean Maitron traveled to the USSR (in August 1933), as well as to Germany (from 1 December 1933 to 1 June 1934) and finally to Barcelona in Spain in 1935. After the 1940 defeat of France, he immediately organized support for political prisoners, and accepted the post of secretary of Asnières's section of the Syndicat national des instituteurs trade-union (which was a member of the Fédération de l'éducation nationale).

After the war, Maitron supported laïcism against clericalism, and was head of the Apremont school in the Vendée from 1950 to 1955. He joined the Union de la gauche socialiste (UGS) in 1959, which participated to the Parti Socialiste Unifié (PSU)'s foundation in 1960. Maitron left the PSU in January 1968, when it considered merging with the Fédération de la gauche démocrate et socialiste (FGDS).

Maitron wrote in 1950 a study on the anarchism movement in France and wrote a complementary study of Paul Delessale, an anarcho-syndicalist. He retired in 1976 and was nominated as chevalier de la Légion d'honneur in 1982 and a chevalier des Arts et Lettres in 1985. Jean Maitron was cremated at the Père Lachaise cemetery and his ashes dispersed.

Legacy
The Fédération de l'éducation nationale (FEN, a teacher's trade union) created in 1996 the Jean Maitron Award, which honors a student's work which builds on Maitron's achievements. A social history book collection also bears his name.

Maitron's work is carried on by a team directed by Claude Pennetier, a researcher at the CNRS, a unit of the Centre d'histoire sociale du XXe (CNRS-University of Paris I). A new series of the Maitron dictionary, in 12 volumes, was published in 2006. Titled Dictionnaire biographique, mouvement ouvrier, mouvement social, it covers the period between 1940 and 1968.

Bibliography
Histoire du mouvement anarchiste en France (1800–1914), SUDEL, Paris, 1951, 744 p., out of print. Second edition with preface from G. Bourgin, 1955, out of print. Reprinted in two volumes by François Maspero, Paris, 1975, reprinted Gallimard. 
Le Syndicalisme révolutionnaire, Paul Delesalle. Preface d'É. Dolléans, Éditions ouvrières, 1952, 176 p. Reprinted by A. Fayard in 1985. 
De la Bastille au Mont Valérien. Dix promenades à travers Paris révolutionnaire, Éditions ouvrières, 1956, 286 p. Out of print.
Ravachol et les anarchistes, collection Archives, 1964, 216 p. Out of print.
Publication de textes : H. Messager, Lettres de déportation, 1871-1876, Paris, Le Sycomore, 380 p., 1979. 
Les Archives de Pierre Monatte (in collaboration with Colette Chambelland), preface from E. Labrousse, Maspero, 1968, 462 p. -- Dictionnaire biographique du mouvement ouvrier, Editions ouvrières then Editions de l'Atelier.
The series of 61 volumes of the French and international Le Maitron (34 published during his life, 27 published after his death under the direction of Claude Pennetier), Editions de l'Atelier.

See also
Anarchism in France

External links
Encyclopédie Maitron 
Award Jean-Maitron  

1910 births
French anarchists
French socialists
University of Paris people
Historians of anarchism
Labor historians
Historians of France
1987 deaths
20th-century French historians
French male non-fiction writers
Le Maitron